Government Inter College is a government intermediate school in Bajauniyahaldu, Uttrakhand state, India. It was founded in 1985. It is a government financed Hindi medium school. The school runs in the Uttrakhand board syllabus.

Infrastructure
The campus is on about two acres of land. The building are facing towards east. There is a separate computer lab and a library towards the southern side.

Faculty
The government of Uttrakhand has appointed twenty-one teachers and five support staff.

References

High schools and secondary schools in Uttarakhand
Education in Nainital district
Educational institutions established in 1985
1985 establishments in Uttar Pradesh